Oliver Venndt Kaszas (born July 27, 1991) is a Danish professional beach volleyball player. He and his brother, Sebastian Venndt Kaszas, represent the national team of Denmark. Oliver and Sebastian, known as The Kaszas Brothers, are sons of the former professional beach volley player Kim Kaszas.

International career 
Kaszas, along with his brother, won the silver medal at the European Championship in 2010. It is the first and only medal for Denmark in an international championship in volley or beach volley.

World Tour 
Kaszas has been playing on Swatch FIVB World Tour since 2008, representing Denmark. At the age of 20 and on the youngest team at the World Tour, Oliver managed to finish 88th in 2011 in the official FIVB World Rankings.

European Championships 
 2nd in 2010
 4th in 2008
 5th in 2009
 9th in 2007

National  
Oliver Venndt Kaszas is in the top of Danish beach volley, he played in the best league for adults since he was 14 years old.
 2015 Danish Champion
 2014 Danish Champion
 2011 2nd Danish National Championships
 2010 1st Overall Team Ranking on the Danish Official Ranking

Olympic Games 2016 
Oliver Venndt Kaszas is participating in an official cooperation between Team Danmark and Danish Volley Federation in order to participate in the Olympic Games in 2016 in Rio de Janeiro, Brazil.

Highlights by year

References

External links 
 Kaszas brothers' official web page

1991 births
Living people
Danish beach volleyball players
Men's beach volleyball players
Sportspeople from Copenhagen